is a Japanese athlete. She competed in the women's high jump at the 1972 Summer Olympics.

See also
List of Asian Games medalists in athletics

References

1950 births
Living people
Place of birth missing (living people)
Japanese female high jumpers
Olympic female high jumpers
Olympic athletes of Japan
Athletes (track and field) at the 1972 Summer Olympics
Asian Games medalists in athletics (track and field)
Asian Games gold medalists for Japan
Athletes (track and field) at the 1970 Asian Games
Medalists at the 1970 Asian Games
Japan Championships in Athletics winners
20th-century Japanese women
21st-century Japanese women